The Preface to Lyrical Ballads is an essay, composed by William Wordsworth, for the second edition published in 1800 of the poetry collection Lyrical Ballads, and then greatly expanded in the third edition of 1802. It has come to be seen as a de facto manifesto of the Romantic movement.

The four guidelines of the manifesto include:
 Ordinary life is the best subject for poetry. (Wordsworth uses common man's language.)
 Everyday language is best suited for poetry
 Expression of feeling is more important than action or plot
 "Poetry is the spontaneous overflow of powerful feelings" that "takes its origin from emotion, recollected in tranquillity." - William Wordsworth

Works by William Wordsworth
1800 works
British poetry
Essays in literary theory
1800s essays
Essays about poetry